Md. Sadequl Arefin (also known as Arefin Matin) is a Bangladeshi academic. He is serving as Vice-Chancellor of Barisal University (BU). Before joining  BU, he served as professor of social work at the University of Rajshahi.

Education
Arefin obtained B.S.S. (Hons) and M.S.S. in Social Work from the University of Rajshahi. He obtained M.Phil. from Rajshahi University’s Institute of Bangladesh Studies (IBS) in 1993 and Ph.D. in 2003.

Career
Arefin started his teaching career at Shahjalal University of Science and Technology (SUST), Sylhet. He joined the Department of Social Work,  Rajshahi University in 1998.
He served as assistant proctor, student advisor and senate member of Rajshahi University.
He was General Secretary of Rajshahi University Teachers’ Association and Central Secretary General of Federation of Bangladesh University Teachers’ Association. 

In November 2019, Sadequl Arefin was appointed as the Vice-Chancellor of Barisal University for the next four years.

Publications
His research focuses on the empowerment of the rural poor. He has 18 international and national research publications.

References 

Year of birth missing (living people)
University of Rajshahi alumni
Academic staff of the University of Rajshahi
Living people
Vice-Chancellors of the University of Barishal